Sami R. Kehela (born 1934), sometimes spelled Sammy Kehela, is a Canadian contract bridge player. A member of the Halls of Fame of both the American Contract Bridge League (ACBL) and the Canadian Bridge Federation, he and his long-time partner, the late Eric Murray, are considered two of the best Canadian players in the history of the game.

Between 1966 and 1974, Kehela and Murray placed second in three Bermuda Bowls as one of three pairs comprising the North America teams. Unique among world players, they represented their country as a partnership in all of the first six quadrennial World Team Olympiads, from Turin in 1960 to Valkenburg in 1980. Together they won the Life Master Men's Pairs, the Life Master Pairs, the Vanderbilt, and the Spingold Trophy three times. 
Kehela and Murray were also runners-up in the 1969 Blue Ribbon Pairs. It was said that the key to their successful partnership was that each thought the other the better player.

Kehela lives with his wife in Toronto (2007). He is a "semi-retired bridge writer and teacher" (perhaps 2001), as former editor of The Ontario Kibitzer and columnist for the monthly Toronto Life.

Kehela and Murray were both inducted into the ACBL Hall of Fame in 2001.

Bridge accomplishments

Honours

 ACBL Hall of Fame, 2001
 Canadian Bridge Federation Hall of Fame, 2010

Wins

 North American Bridge Championships (9)
 von Zedtwitz Life Master Pairs (1) 1969 
 Wernher Open Pairs (1) 1963 
 Blue Ribbon Pairs (1) 1967 
 Nail Life Master Open Pairs (1) 1963 
 Vanderbilt (2) 1966, 1970 
 Spingold (3) 1964, 1965, 1968

Runners-up

 North American Bridge Championships
 Blue Ribbon Pairs (1) 1969 
 Reisinger (2) 1969, 1972 
 Spingold (1) 1963

References

Further reading
  An article split over three pages: first, second and third parts.

External links
  – with video interview
 
 Edgar Kaplan  in an interview with Audrey Grant
  (audio-video)
  (audio-video)

1934 births
Canadian contract bridge players
Contract bridge writers
Bermuda Bowl players
Writers from Toronto
Living people
Date of birth missing (living people)
Place of birth missing (living people)